William Callister MHK (1808–1872) was a timber importer from Ramsey who became a Member of the House of Keys. He was an issuer of a halfpenny trader's currency token in 1831. In October 1865, Callister, together with Samuel Harris, William Moore and Henry Noble founded the Isle of Man Bank.

See also

Traders' Currency Tokens of the Isle of Man

References

1808 births
1872 deaths
Manx politicians